The Thorsberg chape (a bronze piece belonging to a scabbard) is an archeological find from the Thorsberg moor, Germany, that appears to have been deposited as a votive offering. It bears an Elder Futhark runic inscription, one of the earliest known, dating to roughly 200 CE. 

The artifact has been localized on archeological grounds to the region between the Rhine and the Elbe.

The first element owlþu, for wolþu-, means "glory," "glorious one," cf. Old Norse Ullr, Old English wuldor. The second element, -þewaz, means "slave, servant." The whole compound is a personal name or title, "servant of the glorious one" or "servant/priest of Ullr." On the reverse, ni- is the negative particle, waje- corresponds to "woe, ill" (Old Norse vei), and the final element is -mariz "famous" (Old English mǣre). (The "e" and "m" are written together, as a bind-rune, an unusual early example but probably not linguistically significant.) The second word thus translates to "not ill-famous," i.e., "famous, renowned" or "not of ill fame, not dishonored." Similar double negatives are found on other runic inscriptions. The translation of the inscription can thus be either "Wolthuthewaz is well-renowned," or "the servant of Ullr, the renowned." If the first part refers to the god Ullr, it is the only reference to that god from south of Denmark, and also, if a personal name, the only German example of a person named for a specific Germanic god.

Another reading, avoiding the emendation of the first element, reads the first letter ideographically, "Othala," resulting in o[þalan] w[u]lþuþewaz / niwajmariz "inherited property of Wulthuthewaz, the renowned." However, the owner's name is not in the possessive case as would be expected with such a usage; moreover, the rune Fehu, signifying simply "property," would be more apposite; "Othala" can specifically denote real estate.

It is possible that the inscription is poetic; it can be read as an alliterative long-line.

See also
Weapons sacrifice

Notes

Elder Futhark inscriptions
Votive offering
Medieval European metalwork objects